The Secunderabad–Danapur Superfast Express is a daily train operated by Indian Railways between  and  via . Secunderabad–Danapur Express was earlier known as Manikarnika Express and Patna Express. It is the highest Earning Train Of Indian Railways.

Name
The train was initially running between Secunderabad and Varanasi and in 2004 as weekly with numbering 7091 and 7092. The train was extended to Patna during Nitish Kumar's regime. The train served Andhra Pradesh pilgrims to visit Varanasi and Ayodhya  and Sarnath near Varanasi. The train gets its name from one of the famous Ghats of Varanasi, i.e. Manikarnika Ghat.

This train served historically as second alternative to visit North India after 12721UP/12722Dn Dakshin Express and 12723UP/12724DN Telangana Express along with other trains like 12590UP/12589DN Gorakhpur–Secunderabad Express and Bangalore Express.

Historical significance
Though the train gained importance, due to some political and administration influences, it got extended to Cochin Harbour Terminus and with the reduction of frequency from biweekly to weekly, via Tirupati through .

A demand of new train between Hyderabad and Varanasi had been approved by Indian Railways and a new train between "7091" Secunderabad–Varanasi Express and "7092" Varanasi–Secunderabad Express was flagged off as biweekly in 1987. Consequently, the same coaches and rake composition is used as "7089" Cochin–Varanasi Express via Tirupati and "7090" Varanasi–Tirupati Express via Tirupati by cancelling "7489" and "7490" numbering.

Route

Kazipet Junction
Peddapalli Junction
Ramagundam
Mancherial
Bellampally 
Balharshah 
Chandrapur
Sewagram Junction 
Nagpur Junction
Katol
Betul

Katni
Satna

Prayagraj Rambag 
Gyanpur Road

Dildarnagar Junction
Buxar
Ara Junction
Danapur railway station

Traction
It is now hauled by Electric Loco Shed, Lallaguda-based WAP-7 throughout the journey.

See also

Ganga Kaveri Express

References

 South Central Railway official Website
 Manikarnika Express at Indiarailinfo.com

Transport in Secunderabad
Transport in Patna
Rail transport in Telangana
Rail transport in Bihar
Rail transport in Uttar Pradesh
Rail transport in Madhya Pradesh
Rail transport in Maharashtra
Express trains in India